The 2016–17 UCF Knights men's basketball team represented the University of Central Florida during the 2016–17 NCAA Division I men's basketball season. The Knights were members of the American Athletic Conference. The Knights, in the program's 48th season of basketball, were led by first-year head coach Johnny Dawkins and played their home games at the CFE Arena on the university's main campus in Orlando, Florida. They finished the season 24–12, 11–7 in AAC play to finish in fourth place. They defeated Memphis in the quarterfinals of the AAC tournament before losing in the semifinals to SMU. They were invited to the National Invitation Tournament where they defeated Colorado, Illinois State and Illinois to advance to the semifinals at Madison Square Garden for the first time in school history where they lost to the eventual NIT Champion, TCU.

Previous season
The Knights finished the season with a record of 12–18, 6–12 in AAC play to finish in seventh place in conference. They lost in the first round of the AAC tournament to Tulane.

After the season, Donnie Jones was fired as UCF's head coach. On March 24, 2016, the school hired Johnny Dawkins as head coach.

Departures

Incoming transfers

Incoming recruits

Recruiting class of 2017

Roster

Schedule and results

|-
!colspan=9 style=| Non-conference regular season

|-
!colspan=6 style= |AAC regular season

|-
!colspan=9 style=| American Athletic Conference tournament

|-
!colspan=9 style=| NIT

References

UCF Knights men's basketball seasons
UCF
UCF Knights men's basketball
UCF
UCF Knights